Wrightwood is a census-designated place in San Bernardino County, California. The population was 4,525 at the 2010 census, up from the population of 3,837 at the 2000 census. Wrightwood is on the Pacific Crest Trail.

History
Located in a pine-covered valley in the San Gabriel Mountains, the Wrightwood area was first developed as cattle ranches in the 19th century by Nathan and Truman Swarthout. Later, the main ranch, owned by Sumner Wright, was broken up into residential and commercial lots, and by the 1920s a community had taken root. Early ski enthusiasts discovered the north-facing slopes of the San Gabriels above the Swarthout Valley. Until 1937, the ski area, originally known as Big Pines, was part of a Los Angeles County park. After WWII, Big Pines opened their 1946–47 ski season with a new chairlift and the Sepp Benedikter Ski School (according to their ad in the February 1947 issue of Western Skiing magazine).  Highways were built connecting to the major routes in the Cajon Pass, making Wrightwood accessible without serious mountain driving.

The former vacation community is now home to over 4,000 full-time residents. Serrano High School in the neighboring community of Phelan opened in 1982; it also serves Wrightwood and the neighboring community of  Piñon Hills.

In August 2016, part of Wrightwood's population was evacuated as part of mandatory evacuations of over 82,000 people in San Bernardino County due to the Blue Cut Fire. In September 2020, the Bobcat Fire caused evacuation warnings for the Wrightwood area as it raged across the San Gabriel Mountains.

Geography
Wrightwood is located at  (34.355921, −117.629233).

The climate is Mediterranean (Köppen Csb) influenced by its highland position. Summers are vastly moderated by the cooling down of the air at the higher elevation compared to the hot plains to its north and the San Bernardino Valley to the south, although share the similar dry features and a lack of summer thunderstorms. In winter, the Mediterranean tendencies of the more semi-arid lowland areas are exaggerated by orographic lift, causing precipitation comparable to areas much further north in California. However, due to the elevation, a lot of winter precipitation falls as snow. Even so, daytime highs in all months average above freezing, rendering snowpacks unstable and unreliable.

Demographics

2010
The 2010 US Census reported that Wrightwood had a population of 4,525. The racial makeup of Wrightwood was 4,126 (91.2%) White (83.4% Non-Hispanic White), 38 (0.8%) African American, 28 (0.6%) Native American, 51 (1.1%) Asian, 7 (0.2%) Pacific Islander, 112 (2.5%) from other races, and 163 (3.6%) from two or more races. Hispanic or Latino of any race were 538 persons (11.9%).

The Census reported that 4,525 people (100% of the population) lived in households, 0 (0%) lived in non-institutionalized group quarters, and 0 (0%) were institutionalized.

There were 1,857 households, out of which 553 (29.8%) had children under the age of 18 living in them, 1,012 (54.5%) were opposite-sex married couples living together, 161 (8.7%) had a female householder with no husband present, 95 (5.1%) had a male householder with no wife present. There were 113 (6.1%) unmarried opposite-sex partnerships, and 13 (0.7%) same-sex married couples or partnerships. 476 households (25.6%) were made up of individuals, and 161 (8.7%) had someone living alone who was 65 years of age or older. The average household size was 2.44. There were 1,268 families (68.3% of all households); the average family size was 2.91.

The population was spread out, with 1,046 people (23.1%) under the age of 18, 301 people (6.7%) aged 18 to 24, 957 people (21.1%) aged 25 to 44, 1,610 people (35.6%) aged 45 to 64, and 611 people (13.5%) who were 65 years of age or older. The median age was 44.3 years. For every 100 females, there were 105.5 males. For every 100 females age 18 and over, there were 103.8 males.

The homeowner vacancy rate was 2.8%; the rental vacancy rate was 10.6%. 3,346 people (73.9% of the population) lived in owner-occupied housing units and 1,179 people (26.1%) lived in rental housing units.

According to the 2010 United States Census, Wrightwood had a median household income of $72,231, with 4.6% of the population living below the federal poverty line.

2000
In the 2000 census, there were 3,837 inhabitants, 1,486 households, and 1,056 families residing in the CDP. The population density was 1,742.4 inhabitants per square mile (673.4/km). The racial makeup of the CDP was 90.9% White, 0.3% African American, 0.7% Native American, 0.8% Asian, 0.2% Pacific Islander, 2.7% from other races, and 4.4% from two or more races. Hispanic or Latino of any race were 8.8% of the population.

There were 1,486 households, out of which 35.1% had children under the age of 18 living with them, 59.2% were married couples living together, 8.3% had a female householder with no husband present, and 28.9% were non-families. 23.6% of all households were made up of individuals, and 6.5% had someone living alone who was 65 years of age or older. The average household size was 2.6 and the average family size was 3.1.

In the CDP, the population was spread out, with 28.6% under the age of 18, 5.6% from 18 to 24, 27.9% from 25 to 44, 28.1% from 45 to 64, and 9.9% who were 65 years of age or older. The median age was 39 years. For every 100 females, there were 105.1 males. For every 100 females age 18 and over, there were 98.4 males.

The median income for a household in the CDP was $50,338, and the median income for a family was $57,197. Males had a median income of $51,424 versus $40,045 for females. The per capita income for the CDP was $22,902. About 5.8% of families and 6.7% of the population were below the poverty line, including 5.9% of those under age 18 and 14.3% of those age 65 or over.

Politics

Parks and wastewater in Wrightwood are maintained by the Wrightwood community service district since 2017

Education
Public education in Wrightwood is managed by Snowline Joint Unified School District. Students in Wrightwood attend the following schools:

TK-5    Wrightwood Elementary School

6-8       Pinon Mesa Middle School

9-12     Serrano High School

TK-12   Snowline Academy Homeschool

TK-8      The Heritage School (Parent School of Choice)

Snowline Adult School

Mountain High Resort

Just west from Wrightwood sits Big Pines, which hosts the Mountain High Resort, a popular ski/snowboard resort consisting of Three Mountains.

Notable people
 Earl W. Bascom (1906–1995), rodeo champion, actor, inventor, artist; was a school teacher in Wrightwood
 Frank Bogert (1910–2009), rodeo professional, actor, mayor of Palm Springs; raised in Wrightwood
 Aldous Huxley (1894–1963), author; lived in Wrightwood for several years
 Geoffrey Lewis (1935–2015), actor; spent much of his youth in Wrightwood
 Maddie Mastro (born 2000), American professional snowboarder specializing in halfpipe; competed in the 2018 and 2022 Winter Olympics; born and resides in Wrightwood

References

External links

Official Wrightwood Chamber of Commerce
Wrightwood's Information Website
Wrightwood's Community Website
Wrightwood's Community Real Estate Companies
 

 
Census-designated places in San Bernardino County, California
San Gabriel Mountains
Hill and mountain resorts
Ski areas and resorts in California
Unincorporated communities in San Bernardino County, California
Tourist attractions in San Bernardino County, California
Populated places established in the 1920s
1920s establishments in California
Census-designated places in California
Unincorporated communities in California